Partridge-Sheldon House is a historic home located at Jamestown in Chautauqua County, New York. It is a three-story Second Empire style residence built between about 1850 and 1867, and substantially renovated and enlarged in about 1880.  The structure features a Mansard roof with patterned and polychromed slate, decorative eave brackets, and an imposing Mansard-roofed front porch with ornamental iron cresting.  It was the home of Porter Sheldon (1831–1908).

It was listed on the National Register of Historic Places in 2000.

References

External links
Partridge-Sheldon House - Jamestown, New York - U.S. National Register of Historic Places on Waymarking.com

Jamestown, New York
Houses on the National Register of Historic Places in New York (state)
Second Empire architecture in New York (state)
Houses completed in 1867
Houses in Chautauqua County, New York
National Register of Historic Places in Chautauqua County, New York